Haven Holidays is a chain of holiday parks in the United Kingdom. It operates self catering static caravan holiday parks with many also including touring and camping facilities. The company operates 41 sites in the UK in predominantly coastal locations. 

The company was established in 1964 and bought by the Bourne Leisure Group in 2000. In November 2004 Bourne Leisure merged its existing British Holidays chain into the Haven Holidays brand. Bourne Leisure was sold to the Blackstone Group in January 2021.

History 

The current Haven chain is formed from a number of acquisitions by its former brands, including Warner Holiday Camps (now trading as Warner Leisure Hotels). 
After deciding to focus more on its gaming operations such as Mecca Bingo, the Rank Group decided to sell its holiday arm. In October 2000, Bourne Leisure purchased the Rank Group's UK leisure arm, Rank Leisure, for £700 million, which included the Haven, Butlins and Warner Leisure Hotels chains. Haven parks used to come under four categories and were defined by four different colours, All Action Parks (Red), Lively Parks (Blue), Leisurely Parks (Yellow) and Relaxing Parks (Green). Each park category would reflect what type of Entertainment and Activities would take place at that park and also reflect the size of the park.

Following the purchase of Haven by Bourne Leisure they decided to restructure the company and sold off the smaller parks in the company, 12 of these smaller parks were subject to a management buyout and went on to form a new holiday company; Park Resorts, some other parks were sold to Parkdean and Park Holidays UK, with Park Resorts and Parkdean later merging themselves to form Parkdean Resorts. Haven retained its larger parks and Bourne Leisure began integrating both Haven and its existing British Holidays chain in 2002, trading entertainment and facilities between the two brands, until the two companies merged in November 2004 under the name 'Haven and British Holidays'. Due to Haven being the better known name the British Holidays identity was eventually dropped completely by the end of the 2007 season.

Acquisitions   
In 2007, Bourne Leisure purchased Far Grange Park & Golf Club. The park was initially a Haven park for both holidaymakers and caravan owners, as seen in the 2008 brochure, however after just one season, the park has since become an Owners Only park.

In April 2015, Bourne Leisure purchased the Thornwick & Sea Farm Holiday Centre and Greenacre West caravan parks from Flamborough Holidays Ltd; Thornwick & Sea Farm holiday centre's complex was redeveloped for the 2016 season and was rebranded 'Thornwick Bay'.

In 2019, Haven ventured into a new type of resort with the purchase of Celtic Haven Spa Holiday Cottage Resort in Tenby, Pembrokeshire, Wales. The resort is a sister park to Lydstep Beach Holiday Village, situated in the village of Lydstep. The Celtic Haven resort is the first in the Haven brand to operate 365 days a year.

It was announced on the 23 February 2022 that Haven had completed the acquisition, of its first park since being taken over by Blackstone. Acquiring a previously family run park in Skegness, Richmond Holiday Centre, which for the 2023 season has been renamed Skegness Holiday Park. The park offers more than 700 pitches of accommodation, swimming pool, entertainment venues and restaurants and not far from Skegness beach.

Sponsorships and partnerships

In March 2018, Haven partnered with the charity Royal National Lifeboat Institution (RNLI). 

In February 2019, Haven became an official sponsor of Team GB, supporting the team in the build up to the Tokyo 2020 Olympic Games.

Mascots

The first mascot of the Haven brand was Rory the Tiger, first introduced in 1988. Bradley Bear was introduced in 1993 as the mascot of British Holidays, Haven Holidays' former sister brand. As the two brands merged when acquired by Bourne Leisure, the two mascots began to appear alongside each other, despite Bradley Bear not being a part of the 'Tiger Club' brand.

Other characters introduced alongside Rory and Bradley were Greedy the Gorilla, Anxious the Elephant, Sylvester the Snake, Manic the Parrot, Polly the Ragdoll and Naughty Ned, though by the end of the 2009 season, Haven ditched Merlin, Sylvester and Manic, and it was explained by Haven that Merlin had whisked himself, Sylvester and Manic away to a magical place and he didn't know how to get themselves back.

In 2007, the characters had a group name for the first time and were called the 'Zoo Troop' and all had new costumes by this time and Naughty Ned was renamed DJ Ned. However, the previous brand would continue to be used alongside the 'Zoo Troop' brand until the end of the 2012 season when Haven rebranded their characters for 2013, choosing to ditch the jungle setting in favour of a Seaside setting.
This resulted in a rename to the 'Seaside Squad' and Polly becoming a Lifeguard to fit in with the new Seaside Squad brand, and the characters again received new costumes.

In August 2022, Haven announced that the 'Seaside Squad' would be rebranded on the 1 October - Rory will remain however he has been redesigned, Anxious will be renamed to "Annie", Greedy renamed to "George" and Bradley Bear will be replaced by his niece, "Jaz the Bear". In a letter on the Haven website, it was further explained that Bradley Bear was "moving to Florida".

Many regular holiday makers felt that this was too much of a change in one go, and a petition to keep the characters the same has reached close to 3,319 signatures.

Although Polly and Ned are no longer with the Seaside Squad, they are still appearing in puppet form throughout 2023. In letters explained on Haven website, Polly has gone to help the RNLI save people's lives, whilst Ned has gone to Ibiza to go DJing at the clubs there.

Current mascots
 Rory the Tiger (1988–present)
 George the Gorilla (1991–present) (formerly known as Greedy the Gorilla until 2022)
 Annie the Elephant (1991–present) (formerly known as Anxious the Elephant until 2022)
 Jaz the Bear-Bradley's Niece (2022–present)

Former mascots
 Bradley Bear (1993–2022)(Originally British Holidays)
 Sylvester the Snake (1990–2009)(Originally Haven)
 Manic the Parrot (1990–2009)(Originally Haven)
 DJ Ned PenDragon (2000–2022) (still appears in puppet form)(Originally British Holidays)
 Polly Popkins (1998–2022) (still appears in puppet form)(Originally British Holidays)
 Magical Merlin The Wizard (2001–2009)(Originally British Holidays)
 Sailor Sue (1998–2000)(Originally British Holidays)
 Tommy The Soldier(1998-2000)(Originally British Holidays)
 Rooster the Hillbilly (2000–2002)(Originally British Holidays)

Holiday parks and resorts

There are currently 41 Haven parks in the United Kingdom. The number of Haven parks peaked at 56 in 1999, not long before their merger with British Holidays in 2002, however many of the smaller parks were sold off throughout 2001 and again in October 2004 in a move that Haven said was to improve the standards of the larger and more profitable parks. The majority of parks were sold were to Park Resorts, Parkdean (both of which now merged into Parkdean Resorts) and Park Holidays UK (at the time known as Cinque Ports Leisure). 

 Blackpool: Cala Gran, Marton Mere
 Cornwall: Perran Sands, Riviere Sands
 Devon: Devon Cliffs
 Dorset: Littlesea, Rockley Park, Seaview, Weymouth Bay
 Essex: The Orchards
 Kent and Sussex: Allhallows, Church Farm, Combe Haven
 Lake District: Lakeland
 Lincolnshire: Golden Sands, Thorpe Park, Skegness Holiday Park
 Norfolk: Caister-on-Sea, Hopton, Seashore, Wild Duck
 Northumberland: Berwick, Haggerston Castle
 Scotland: Craig Tara (previously Butlins Ayr), Seton Sands
 Somerset: Burnham-on-Sea, Doniford Bay
 Wales: Greenacres, Cardigan View (a sister park to Greenacres), Garreg Wen (a sister park to Greenacres), Hafan y Mor (previously Butlins Pwllheli), Lydstep Beach, Celtic Haven (a sister park to Lydstep Beach), Kiln Park, Penally Court (a sister park to Kiln Park), Presthaven, Quay West
 Yorkshire: Blue Dolphin, Primrose Valley (part of this park now occupies land that formed Butlins Filey), Reighton Sands, Thornwick Bay, Far Grange (owners only)

Former holiday parks (both Haven and British Holidays)
 Cornwall: Duporth, St. Minver, Trelawne Manor, St Ives, Mullion
 Devon: Bideford Bay, Challaborough Bay, Lyme Bay, South Bay, Torquay, Devon Valley
 Dorset: Chesil Beach, Sandhills, West Bay
 Essex: St. Osyth Beach (formerly Bel Air), Steeple Bay
 Hampshire: Mill Rythe, Solent Breezes
 Isle of Wight: Harcourt Sands, Lower Hyde, Nodes Point, Thorness Bay, Fort Warden
 Kent and Sussex: Alberta, Sheerness, Ashcroft, Winchelsea Sands
 Lancashire: Beacon Fell View
 Lincolnshire: Coastfield
 Norfolk: California Cliffs, Heacham Beach, Cherry Tree
 Northumberland: Riverside
 Scotland: Wemyss Bay, Erigmore House, Sundrum Castle, Grannies Heilan Hame, Tummel Valley, Nairn Lochloy
 Suffolk: Felixstowe Beach, Suffolk Sands, Kessingland Beach
 Wales: Brynowen, Carmarathen Bay, Manorbier, Pendine Sands, Ty Mawr, Lido Beach
 Yorkshire: Barmston Beach, Cayton Bay, Whitby

Parks owned by British Holidays before 2004
 Blackpool: Cala Gran, Marton Mere
 Dorset: Rockley Park
 Essex: The Orchards
 Kent and Sussex: Allhallows, Church Farm
 Lake District: Lakeland
 Lincolnshire: Thorpe Park
 Norfolk: Hopton
 Northumberland: Berwick, Haggerston Castle
 Scotland: Seton Sands
 Somerset: Burnham-on-Sea
 Wales: Greenacres, Kiln Park, Lydstep Beach, Penally Court, Quay West

References

External links
Haven Holidays Official Website

Travel and holiday companies of the United Kingdom
British companies established in 1964
Transport companies established in 1964